Fascinating Youth is a 1926 American silent romantic comedy film directed by Sam Wood. It starred Charles "Buddy" Rogers (in his feature debut), along with Thelma Todd and Josephine Dunn in supporting roles.  Many well-known personalities made guest appearances in the film, judging a beauty contest in one scene, and Clara Bow makes a cameo appearance in her second film for Paramount Pictures.

The film is now considered lost, with only the trailer surviving.

Cast
 Charles "Buddy" Rogers as Teddy Ward
 Ivy Harris as Jeanne King
 Jack Luden as Ross Page
 Walter Goss as Randy Furness 
 Claude Buchanan as Bobby Stearns
 Mona Palma as Dotty Sinclair
 Thelma Todd as Lorraine Lane
 Josephine Dunn as Loris Lane
 Thelda Kenvin as Betty Kent
 Jeanne Morgan as Mae Oliver
 Dorothy Nourse as Mary Arnold
 Irving Hartley as Johnnie
 Gregory Blackton as Frederick Maine
 Robert Andrews as Duke Slade
 Charles Brokaw as Gregory
 Iris Gray as Sally Lee
 Ralph Lewis as John Ward
 Joseph Burke as Ward's Secretary
 James Bradbury, Sr. as The Professor
 Harry Sweet as The Sheriff
 William Black as Deputy Sheriff
 Richard Dix as himself 
 Adolphe Menjou as himself
 Clara Bow as herself
 Lois Wilson as herself 
 Percy Marmont as himself 
 Chester Conklin as himself 
 Thomas Meighan as himself 
 Lila Lee as herself 
 Lewis Milestone as himself 
 Malcolm St. Clair as himself

References

External links
 
 
 Fascinating Youth at SilentEra

1926 films
1926 romantic comedy films
American romantic comedy films
American silent feature films
American black-and-white films
Famous Players-Lasky films
Films directed by Sam Wood
Lost American films
Paramount Pictures films
Lost romantic comedy films
1926 lost films
1920s American films
Silent romantic comedy films
Silent American comedy films